Traversodon is an extinct genus of cynodonts. It was a relative of the ancestor to modern mammals.

Traversodon lived in what is now South America.

Species
Traversodon stahleckeri was first found by Friedrich von Huene in 1936 in the Geopark of Paleorrota, São Pedro do Sul, Brazil.

References

External links 
 Paleobiology Database
 UNIVERSIDADE DO RIO GRANDE DO SUL

Traversodontids
Prehistoric cynodont genera
Late Triassic synapsids of South America
Fossil taxa described in 1936
Taxa named by Friedrich von Huene